Jackie Shiels (born 1 January 1985) is an Irish female rugby union player. She played at the 2010 and 2014 Women's Rugby World Cup. She made five conversions to help  secure a semi-final spot at the 2014 World Cup.

Shiels is a teacher by profession and previously played Gaelic football and soccer.

References

External links
Irish Rugby Player Profile

1985 births
Living people
Irish female rugby union players
Ireland women's international rugby union players
Irish expatriate sportspeople in England
Irish schoolteachers
Leinster Rugby women's players
Irish Exiles women's rugby union players